Det Nya Sverige (Swedish: The New Sweden) was a conservative political magazine published in Stockholm, Sweden, between 1907 and 1928. Its subtitle was tidskrift för nationella spörsmål (Swedish: A Journal of National Questions).

History and profile
Det Nya Sverige was launched as an organ of the radical conservative movement, Unghöger (Swedish: The Young Right), in 1907. Its founding editor was Adrian Molin who also edited the magazine until 1926 when Gustaf Olsson replaced him in the post. 

In the second year of publication Molin argued in his column that Det Nya Sverige was not a mainstream magazine. He maintained that it addressed those who had an interest in public affairs independent of their social class and political party focusing on all questions concerning the Swedish cultivation and spiritual topics. The magazine was published by different publishing houses during its existence. It had a conservative political stance and came out monthly. The magazine was first headquartered in Stockholm and moved in 1926 to Lund where it was published until its demise in 1928.

References

External links
 Det Nya Sverige : tidskrift för nationella spörsmål magazine issues digitized by Google Books at the Internet Archive

1907 establishments in Sweden
1928 disestablishments in Sweden
Conservative magazines
Defunct magazines published in Sweden
Defunct political magazines
Magazines established in 1907
Magazines disestablished in 1928
Magazines published in Stockholm
Monthly magazines published in Sweden
Political magazines published in Sweden
Swedish-language magazines
Mass media in Lund